The Itoh Emi 16 Fuji-go  (Fuji), built in 1920, was intended as a cheap and simple general purpose civil biplane but gained publicity  with exhibition flights and successful speed and altitude contests against higher-powered fighter aircraft.

Design and development

Though the Fuji-go was best known for its successes in speed contests, it was designed as a multi-purpose, economical civil aircraft, powered by a war-surplus Le Rhône rotary engine and with a cost kept low by structural simplicities such as wings without sweep or stagger.

It was a two bay biplane with a wooden structure and fabric covering. Its wings had rectangular plans apart from blunted tips, braced together with pairs of parallel interplane struts. Behind the engine the fuselage was rectangular in section with two open cockpits, one under the upper wing and the other for the pilot under its trailing edge, which had a small cut-out to improve the upward field of view. The forward cockpit could carry a passenger or an extra fuel tank to increase the range.

The tail was conventional with a tailplane mounted on top of the fuselage carrying elevators with a cut-out for rudder movement. Both the small fin and generous balanced rudder had polyangular profiles.

The Fuji-go had fixed, conventional landing gear with wheels on an axle between pairs of V-struts mounted on the lower fuselage longerons and a long tailskid mounted below the fin leading edge.

Its first flight was on 22 July 1920.

Operational history

The Fuji-go was soon into competitions, beginning with the First Prize-winning Flight Competition held in August. It went on to perform publicity flights over Kyoto and Osaka. It also competed in the Imperial Flying Association's Second Airmail Flying Contest which involved a race between Osaka and Kurume. This increased the maximum speed by 21%. Goto and the Fuji-go came second, gaining an 8,000 yen prize and beaten only by a SPAD XIII fighter with a  engine.

After a period of further promotional flights the aircraft returned to competition in May in the 1921 Second Prize-winning Flight Competition. It was flown into third place by Komayoshi Yasuoka.

Variants
Data from Japanese Aircraft 1910-1941 pp. 116–7

Emi 18 powered by a  Clerget nine cylinder rotary engine. Span , greater wing area and shorter. One only, 1921.
Emi 19 powered by a  Turrin nine cylinder rotary engine. Span  and shorter. One only, 1921.
Emi 20 powered by a  Le Rhône rotary engine. Span  and shorter. One only, 1921.

Specifications (original, uncropped lower wing)

References

16
Biplanes
Single-engined tractor aircraft
1920s Japanese civil aircraft
Racing aircraft